Alum Creek may refer to:

Communities
Alum Creek, Ohio, an unincorporated community 
Alum Creek, Texas, an unincorporated community 
Alum Creek, West Virginia, an unincorporated community

Streams
Alum Creek (Ohio), a creek in Ohio
Alum Creek State Park
Alum Creek (South Dakota), a stream in South Dakota
Alum Creek (Cibolo Creek), a creek in Texas
Alum Creek (Coal River), a stream in West Virginia
Alum Creek (Tug Fork), a stream in West Virginia

See also
Alum Fork